Zayed II Military College or Zayed the Second Military College is an Emirati military college and the principle military academy and officer training institution in the United Arab Emirates Army based in Al Ain, United Arab Emirates. It was founded on February 1, 1972, by Sheikh Zayed bin Sultan Al Nahyan, the founding president of the United Arab Emirates.

History
The military college was founded on 1 February 1972 by Sheikh Zayed bin Sultan Al Nahyan, the founding president of the United Arab Emirates, after 2 months of the independence of the United Arab Emirates. The college graduated its first batch of officers on April 10, 1972. It was officially inaugurated on May 3 by Sheikh Khalifa bin Zayed Al Nahyan.

Zayed II Military College celebrated its golden jubilee and 50th anniversary of founding on February 1, 2022.

See also
Khalifa bin Zayed Air College

References

Military academies
1972 establishments in the United Arab Emirates
Education in the United Arab Emirates
Military academies of the United Arab Emirates
Universities and colleges in the Emirate of Abu Dhabi